Churchill Falls is a waterfall on the Churchill River in Labrador, Canada.

Churchill Falls may also refer to:

 Churchill Falls, Newfoundland and Labrador, a community in Newfoundland and Labrador, Canada
 Churchill Falls (Labrador) Corporation Limited, a Canadian electric company
 Churchill Falls Airport, in Churchill Falls, Newfoundland and Labrador

See also